Orzechów may refer to:

 Orzechów, Pabianice County in Łódź Voivodeship (central Poland)
 Orzechów, Radomsko County in Łódź Voivodeship (central Poland)
 Orzechów, Subcarpathian Voivodeship (south-east Poland)
 Orzechów, Masovian Voivodeship (east-central Poland)
 Orzechów, West Pomeranian Voivodeship (north-west Poland)